Gustav Adolf may refer to:

People
 Gustavus Adolphus (1594–1632), or Gustaf II Adolf, King of Sweden 1611–1632
 Gustav IV Adolf (1778–1837), King of Sweden 1792–1809
 Gustaf VI Adolf (1882–1973), King of Sweden 1950–1973
 Prince Gustaf Adolf, Duke of Västerbotten (1906–1947), son of Gustaf VI Adolf, father of Carl XVI Gustaf of Sweden
 Gustav Adolph, Count of Nassau-Saarbrücken (1632–1677), ruling prince in the Holy Roman Empire
 Gustav Adolph, Duke of Mecklenburg-Güstrow (1633–1695), last ruler of Mecklenburg-Güstrow
 Gustaf Adolf Lewenhaupt (1619–1656), Swedish soldier and statesman.
 Gustav Adolf Bergenroth (1813–1869), German historian
 Gustav Adolf Deissmann (1866–1937), German Protestant theologian
 Gustav Adolf Fischer (1848–1886), German explorer of Africa
 Gustav Adolf Michaelis (1798–1848), German obstetrician
 Gustav Adolf Scheel (1907–1979), German physician and commander of the Sicherheitspolizei in the Third Reich
 Gustav-Adolf Schur (born 1931), former German cyclist
 Gustav Adolf Steengracht von Moyland (1902–1969), German diplomat and politician
 Gustav Adolf von Götzen (1866–1910), German explorer and Governor of German East Africa
 Gustav-Adolf von Zangen (1892–1964), German general and commander of the German 15th Army
 Gustaf Adolf Westring (1900–1963), Swedish Air Force lieutenant general

Places
 Gustav Adolf Grammar School, in Tallinn, Estonia
 Gustav Adolf Stave Church, in Hahnenklee, Harz, Germany
 Gustav-Adolf-Straße station, a metro station in Nuremberg, Germany
 Gustav Adolfs torg, Stockholm, a public square in Stockholm, Sweden
 Gustavus Adolphus College, in St. Peter, Minnesota, United States
 Royal Gustavus Adolphus Academy, in Uppsala, Sweden
 Gustav Adolfs, the Swedish name of the municipality Hartola in Finland

Other
 Gustavus Adolphus Day, November 6
 Gustav-Adolf-Werk
 Gustav Adolph (barque) (1879-1902), Norwegian barque wrecked near Port Elizabeth

See also
 Gustav (disambiguation)